Levi and the Rockats are a British rockabilly revival band originally from Essex but currently based in New York City. They are recognised as one of the pioneering neo-rockabilly groups of the 1980s.

History
Levi & the Rockats were founded in 1977 by Levi Dexter, a Teddy Boy from Southend on Sea. His main influences included Gene Vincent, Eddie Cochran and Elvis Presley, musicians popular among the 1960s British rocker subculture.
In December 1979 Levi & the Rockats disbanded and the Rockats continued under that name.
Levi Dexter went solo and is still performing rockabilly music and was inducted into the Rockabilly Hall Of Fame.

In the 1980s, the Rockats opened for groups like Kiss, Iggy Pop, The Clash, David Bowie, Tina Turner, Thin Lizzy, and The Pretenders. After Levi Dexter left the band, it was re-formed with Dibbs Preston on vocals. This band is notable as one of the first rockabilly groups to incorporate punk rock and new wave influences to appeal to both punks and Teds, influencing later groups like Brian Setzer's Stray Cats and Dave Alvin's The Blasters, while retaining the raw authenticity of pre-British invasion Rock and roll.

Awards
The Rockats toured the UK, Japan and US. They also appeared on Andy Warhol's TV show in 1979 and were interviewed by Deborah Harry. Their most successful single was "Make that Move" which charted on the MTV charts in 1984, shortly after the band was signed on with RCA records.

Discography

Studio recordings
"Room to Rock/All Thru the Nite" (Peer Communications 1979)
"Rockabilly Idol/Note from the South" (Peer Communications 1979)
"Rockabilly Doll" 7" (Kat Tale Records, 1980)
Make That Move EP (RCA, 1983)
Downtown Saturday Night LP (Jimco Records Japan, 1994)
The Good, the Bad, the Rockin''' LP (Fury Records, 1997)True Hearted Woman EP (Downer Records Japan, 2000)Rollin' Thunder LP (Downer Records Japan, 2001)Wild Love LP (Blue Leaf Records, 2003)Rockin' Together LP (Lanark Records, 2013)

Live recordingsLive at the Ritz LP (Island Records, 1981)Live at the Louisiana Hayride LP (Posh Boy Records, 1981)Raw in Japan LP (Jimco Records Japan, 1992)The Last Bop - Farewell 1984'' LP (Revel Yell Music Japan, 2003)

Members
Levi Dexter - lead vocal 
Dibbs Preston - lead vocal
Smutty Smiff (Stephen Dennis Smith) - standup bass
Mick Barry - rhythm guitar, vocals
Barry Ryan - lead guitar
Dean Thomas - drummer
Guy Hemmer - rhythm guitar
Danny B.Harvey - lead guitar
Lewis King (Curt Weiss) - drums
Ira Kaye - drums
Steve Clark - drums
Jerry 'Nigs" Nolan - drums

References

Rockabilly music groups
Cowpunk musical groups
English new wave musical groups
Musical groups established in 1977